Nobel is a 2016 Norwegian television series that premiered on NRK on 25 September 2016. It depicts Norway’s military involvement in Afghanistan. It was produced by Monster Scripted for the Norwegian broadcaster NRK and was broadcast under the title Nobel – fred for enhver pris (Nobel – Peace at Any Cost). The series under the title Nobel was made available on Netflix for streaming on 13 December 2016. Nobel was subsequently removed from Netflix in November 2020.

Background
The series originated from its director Per-Olav Sørensen who was interested in making a contemporary story about Norwegian soldiers involved in military operations in Afghanistan. The script was written with Mette Marit Bøstad and Stephen Uhlander. The producer Håkon Briseid pitched the idea to NRK who then commissioned the TV series. The series was filmed in Oslo, Prague and Morocco in 2015. The production cost 68 million Norwegian krone (€7.9m), and the series is a co-production with Sirena Film in collaboration with DR (Denmark),  SVT (Sweden) and RÚV (Iceland) with support from the Norwegian Film Institute and Nordisk Film & TV Fond.

The series was acquired for broadcast in France, Israel, and the Benelux countries. It was also sold to Netflix for streaming in various English-speaking countries.  The first episode of seven was broadcast as a double episode in Norway, but released as two single episodes on Netflix, making a total of eight episodes for the series.

Cast
 Aksel Hennie as Lieutenant Erling Riiser, a paratrooper patrol commander 
 Tuva Novotny as Johanne Riiser, Erling's wife and the Foreign Minister's Chief of Staff
 Anders Danielsen Lie as Lieutenant Jon Petter Hals, paratrooper patrol commander prior to Erling
 Dennis Storhøi as Brigadier Jørund Ekeberg, Head of Forsvarets Spesialkommando
 Mads Sjøgård Pettersen as Lieutenant Håvard Bakkeli
 Danica Curcic as Lieutenant Adella Hanefi, an interpreter in the Norwegian Intelligence Service
  as Minister of Foreign Affairs Johan Ruud
 Odd-Magnus Williamson as Second Lieutenant Hans Ivar Johansen
 Kyrre Hellum as Major Jan Burås, Erling's superior officer
 Mattis Herman Nyquist as Hektor Stolt-Hansen, Project Manager for the "Fruit for Life" aid organization
 Amund Wiegand Blakstvedt as Rikard Riiser, Erling's and Johanne's son
  as Rolf Innherad, a geologist representing Olje for utvikling (OFU)
  as Sharif Zamani, a powerful landowner with ties to Taliban
  as Mullah Ahmed, the Taliban commander in the Balkh Province
 Ayesha Wolasmal as Wasima Zamani, Sharif's wife and cousin 
  as Heydar Zamani, Sharif's uncle and personal advisor
 André Jerman as Kristoffer Abel, The Foreign Minister's Director of communications 
 Rolf Kristian Larsen as Sven Rasch, a War correspondent for VG
 Eirik Evjen as Sergeant Sigurd Sønsteby
 Ingrid Jørgensen Dragland as Minister of Defence Kjersti Mo
 Heidi Toini as Charlotte Heiberg, Johanne's personal assistant
 Ellen Horn as Nora Backer, the Chairwoman of the Norwegian Nobel Committee
 Samuel Fröler as Gunnar Riiser, Erling's father and a former professional jockey

Reception
The series was generally well-received by Norwegian critics. Kjetil Lismoen of Aftenposten praised the acting and found the portrayal of the political machinations and the cost that comes from being involved in a war credible. Marie Kleve of Dagbladet considered the series to be socially relevant and significant while at the same time also entertaining to viewers. Øystein David Johansen of VG  thought it an ambitious series with outstanding portrayal of the troops in Afghanistan, but found that it was the human drama in the series that impressed him most.

The premiere double episode was watched initially by 750,000 viewers excluding online viewers in Norway (a market share of 45%), with its Total Screen rating reaching 1.322 million viewers when online viewings over a longer period are included.  There were over 1 million total viewers for every episode of the series.  The final episode was watched by 703,000 viewers on its initial broadcast, with its total audience expected to reach 1.2 million.

The series was nominated for the 2016 Prix Italia in the TV drama category. It won the 2016 Prix Europa Media Award for Best European TV movie/mini-series, and in 2017, it won the Rose d'Or in the Drama Series category.

Episodes

Awards and nominations

Home Video

Nobel was released on DVD in the UK on 12 November 2018.

References

External links
  at NRK
 

2010s Norwegian television series
Norwegian-language television shows
Norwegian drama television series
Television shows set in Afghanistan
Television shows set in Norway